Felskinn is a rocky outcrop of the Pennine Alps, situated above Saas Fee in the canton of Valais.

Felskinn is the lower station of the Metro Alpin which gives access to the Mittelallalin.

References

External links
 Felskinn saas-fee.ch

Mountains of the Alps
Mountains of Switzerland
Cable cars in Switzerland
Mountains of Valais